Film4 Productions is a British film production company owned by Channel Four Television Corporation. The company has been responsible for backing many films made in the United Kingdom. The company's first production was Walter, directed by Stephen Frears, which was released in 1982. It is especially known for its gritty, kitchen sink-style films and period drama.

History 
In 1981, producer David Rose left the BBC for Channel 4 where he was appointed the Commissioning Editor for Fiction by Jeremy Isaacs, the channel's founding Chief Executive but became mostly identified with the Film on Four strand. With an initial overall budget of £6 million a year, Channel Four Films was to invest in twenty films annually for Film on Four. The first film backed was Neil Jordan's debut film Angel (1982). The first film shown as part of Film on Four was Stephen Frears's Walter which was screened on 2 November 1982, the launch date of Channel 4. P'tang, Yang, Kipperbang screened the following day was also an early highlight. Originally, the company's films were intended for television screenings alone; the "holdback" system prevented investment in theatrical films by television companies because of the length of time (then three years) before broadcasters could screen them. An agreement soon concluded with the Cinema Exhibitors Association allowed a brief period of cinema exhibition if the budget of the films was below £1.25 million. Channel Four Films struck several deals with other film production companies including the BFI Production Board, Goldcrest Films and Merchant Ivory. By 1984, Channel Four Films were investing in a third of the feature films made in the UK. 

Channel Four's Business Development Department was formed in 1983 for TV and film sales and they also invested in foreign films including Wim Wenders' Paris, Texas (1984) and Jan Svankmajer's Alice (1988). In 1985 FilmFour International was created as a separate international film sales arm and to invest in foreign film, including Andrei Tarkovsky's The Sacrifice (1986).

Channel Four Film's first big hit was Frears' third feature film for the cinema, My Beautiful Laundrette, in 1985. Originally shot in 16mm for Channel 4 it was met with such critical acclaim at the Edinburgh Film Festival that it was acquired by Orion Classics and distributed to cinemas and became an international success. 

In 1987, FilmFour International agreed a licensing deal with Orion Classics to handle US distribution of two more FilmFour features, Rita, Sue and Bob Too and A Month in the Country. By 1987, Channel 4 had an interest in half the films being made in the United Kingdom. 

Rose and Channel Four Films are credited by many as being a significant figure in the regeneration of British cinema and particularly remembered for films such as Wish You Were Here, Dance With a Stranger, Mona Lisa, and Letter to Brezhnev. Channel Four Films also invested in early Working Title Films as well as most of the films of Frears, Ken Loach and Mike Leigh.  Leigh told writer Hannah Rothschild around 2008 that Film on Four had saved the British film industry: "This is a non-negotiable, historical fact of life and anybody who suggests that this isn’t the case is simply either suffering from some kind of ignorance or has got some terrible chip." 

Rose remained in his post as Commissioning Editor until March 1990. During his tenure at Channel 4, Rose approved the making of 136 films, half of which received cinema screenings. Of the films Rose backed, 20 were from overseas sources, including work by directors Theo Angelopoulos, Andrei Tarkovsky and Wim Wenders. The company also helped British minority filmmakers including Po-Chih Leong (Ping Pong (1986)); Horace Ové (Playing Away (1986)) and Hanif Kureishi (My Beautiful Laundrette; Sammy and Rosie Get Laid (1987)). This continued after Rose's departue with films directed by Gurinder Chadha (Bhaji on the Beach (1993)) and Steve McQueen (Hunger (2008)).

David Aukin joined as head of drama in October 1990 and took over responsibility for Film on Four. He changed his title to head of film in 1997 which he remained until 1998.

The company had another big international success with Jordan's The Crying Game in 1992. In addition it was nominated for the Academy Award for Best Picture as was Howards End the same year. Damage also received an Academy Award nomination that year. Later in 1993, Leigh's Naked and Loach's Raining Stones were entered into competition at the 1993 Cannes Film Festival.

The following year, Mike Newell's Four Weddings and a Funeral became the highest-grossing UK film of all time and Danny Boyle's Trainspotting (1996) was also very successful. 

In the 1990s, Channel Four partnered with The Samuel Goldwyn Company to create a distribution company to release Channel Four films and Goldwyn films in the UK but Goldwyn pulled out late on and in August 1995, Film Four Distributors was formed. Its first release was Blue Juice (1995) and its first major successes were Secrets & Lies and Brassed Off in 1996. 

In 1998, the company was re-branded as FilmFour with an annual budget of £32 million for 8 to 10 films. East Is East (1999) becomes their biggest self-funded film. In 2000, the company signed a three-year deal with Warner Bros. to make seven films with budgets of more than £13 million but their first, Charlotte Gray (2001) was not the success they hoped for.

The company cut its budget and staff significantly in 2002, due to mounting losses, and was reintegrated into the drama department of Channel 4. The name "Film4 Productions" was introduced in 2006 to tie in with the relaunch of the FilmFour broadcast channel as Film4.

Tessa Ross was head of both Film4 and Channel 4 drama from 2002 to 2014.

Selected list of productions 
This is a list of the most notable productions by Film4.

 12 Years a Slave (co-production with Regency Enterprises, River Road Entertainment and Plan B)
 127 Hours (co-production with Pathé, Fox Searchlight Pictures, Everest Entertainment, Cloud Eight Films, Darlow Smithson Productions and Warner Bros. Pictures)
 20,000 Days on Earth (co-production with British Film Institute)
 24 Hour Party People (co-production with United Artists, UK Film Council, Revolution Films and Baby Cow Productions)
 45 Years (co-production with British Film Institute)
 '71 (co-production with British Film Institute, Screen Yorkshire, Creative Scotland and Warp Films)
 A Complete History of My Sexual Failures (co-production with Warp Films, Screen Yorkshire, EM Media, Madman Entertainment and UK Film Council)
 A Field in England
 A Life Less Ordinary (co-production with PolyGram Filmed Entertainment and 20th Century Fox)
 A Most Wanted Man (co-production with FilmNation Entertainment)
 A Month in the Country (co-production with Euston Films)
 A Room with a View (co-production with Merchant Ivory Productions and Goldcrest Films)
 A Zed and Two Noughts (co-production with British Film Institute and Artificial Eye)
 Amy (co-production with Universal Music, Playmaker Films & Krishwerkz Entertainment)
 American Animals
 American Buffalo (co-production with Capitol Films)
 American Honey (co-production with Parts & Labor, Pulse Films, ManDown Pictures, British Film Institute, and Maven Pictures)
 An Evening with Beverly Luff Linn (co-production with British Film Institute)
 And When Did You Last See Your Father? (co-production with Sony Pictures Classics, UK Film Council, EM Media, Tiger Aspect, Bórd Scannán na hÉireann/Irish Film Board and European Development Fund)
 Angel
 Angels & Insects (co-production with The Samuel Goldwyn Company)
 Another Year (co-production with Thin Man Films)
 Attack the Block (co-production with Big Talk Productions, StudioCanal and UK Film Council)
 Backbeat (co-production with PolyGram Filmed Entertainment)
 Bad Behaviour
 Bandit Queen (co-production with Kaleidoscope Entertainment)
 Beast (co-production with British Film Institute)
 Beautiful Thing
 Been So Long (co-production with Netflix and British Film Institute)
 Bent (co-production with Arts Council of England)
 Berberian Sound Studio (co-production with Warp X Productions, Screen Yorkshire and UK Film Council)
 Bhaji on the Beach
 Billy Lynn's Long Halftime Walk (co-production with TriStar Pictures)
 Birthday Girl (co-production with Miramax Films, Mirage Enterprises and HAL Films)
 Black Sea (co-production with Focus Features)
 Blue (co-production with BBC Radio 3 and Arts Council of Great Britain)
 Blue Juice
 Blonde Fist
 Brassed Off (co-production with Miramax Films and Prominent Features)
 Bread and Roses
 Brian and Charles (co-production with British Film Institute and Mr Box Productions)
 Brothers of the Head (co-production with Screen East and EM Media)
 Buena Vista Social Club (co-production with Road Movies Filmproduktion and Arte)
 Buffalo Soldiers (co-production with Good Machine and Miramax Films)
 Bunny and the Bull (co-production with Warp X Productions, Wild Bunch, Optimum Releasing, Screen Yorkshire and UK Film Council)
 Career Girls
 Carla's Song (co-production with Glasgow Film Office and Televisión Española)
 Carol (co-production with Number 9 Films and Killer Films)
 Catch Me Daddy (co-production with British Film Institute and Screen Yorkshire)
 Charlotte Gray (co-production with Ecosse Films and Warner Bros.)
 Christmas Carol: The Movie (co-production with UK Film Council)
 Cold War (co-production with British Film Institute and MK2)
 Comrades (co-production with now-defunct National Film Finance Corporation)
 Croupier (co-production with Arte and Westdeutscher Rundfunk)
 Cuban Fury (co-production with British Film Institute)
 Damage (co-production with Le Studio Canal+ and Canal+)
 Dance with a Stranger
 Dancer in the Dark (co-production with Canal+, France 3 Cinéma, Zentropa and Fine Line Features)
 Dancing at Lughnasa (co-production with Sony Pictures Classics, Bórd Scannán na hÉireann/Irish Film Board, Raidió Teilifís Éireann and Capitol Films)
 Dead Man's Shoes
 Death and the Maiden (co-production with Capitol Films, Canal+, TF1 and Fine Line Features)
 Death to Smoochy (co-production with Senator Film and Warner Bros.)
 Deep Water
 Dirt Music (co-production with ScreenWest)
 Disobedience (co-production with FilmNation Entertainment and Element Pictures)
 Dog Eat Dog (co-production with Tiger Aspect Productions)
 Dogma (produced by View Askew)
 Donkey Punch (co-production with EM Media, Madman Entertainment, Screen Yorkshire, UK Film Council and Warp X Productions)
 Dream Horse (co-production with Cornerstone Films, Ingenious Media, Raw, Topic Studios, FFilm Cymru Wales, Bleecker Street, Sony Pictures Worldwide Acquisitions and Warner Bros. Pictures)
 Drowning by Numbers
 Dust Devil(co-production with Miramax Films)
 East Is East
 Eat the Rich (co-production with Michael White)
 Elizabeth (co-production with PolyGram Filmed Entertainment, Meridian and Working Title Films)
 Enduring Love (co-production with Pathé, UK Film Council and Ingenious Film Partners)
 Ex Machina (co-production with Universal Pictures and DNA Films)
 Experience Preferred... But Not Essential
 Everybody's Talking About Jamie (co-production with New Regency Pictures, 20th Century Fox and Warp Films)
 Fever Pitch
 Fighting with My Family (co-production with Metro-Goldwyn-Mayer, WWE Studios and Seven Bucks Productions)
 For Those in Peril (co-production with Warp X Productions)
 Four Lions (co-production with Warp Films, Wild Bunch and Optimum Releasing)
 Four Weddings and a Funeral (co-production with PolyGram Filmed Entertainment and Working Title Films)
 Frank
 Franklyn (co-production with Recorded Picture Company, HanWay Films and UK Film Council)
 Free Fire (co-production with British Film Institute)
 Funny Games (co-production with Warner Independent Pictures and Tartan Films)
 Gabriel and Me (co-production with Pathé, Isle of Man Film and UK Film Council)
 Gangster No. 1 (co-production with Medienboard Berlin-Brandenburg, Road Movies Filmproduktion and BSkyB)
 Giro City
 God on the Rocks
 Gregory's Two Girls
 Greed (co-production with Columbia Pictures and Revolution Films)
 Hallam Foe (co-production with Ingenious Film Partners, Glasgow Film Office, Scottish Screen and Sigma Films)
 Happy-Go-Lucky (co-production with Ingenious Film Partners and Summit Entertainment)
 Hear My Song
 Hero
 Hidden City
 High Hopes
 High-Rise (co-production with Recorded Picture Company, HanWay Films and the British Film Institute)
 Hilary and Jackie
 Holy Smoke! (co-production with Miramax Films)
 How I Live Now (co-production with British Film Institute, Magnolia Pictures and Passion Pictures)
 How to Lose Friends & Alienate People (co-production with UK Film Council)
 How to Talk to Girls at Parties (co-production with HanWay Films, See-Saw Films and Little Punk)
 How to Build a Girl (co-production with Tango Entertainment, British Film Institute, Monumental Pictures, Protagonist Pictures)
 Howards End
 Hunger
 Hush (co-production with Warp X, Pathé, Screen Yorkshire, UK Film Council and Optimum Releasing)
 Hyde Park on Hudson (co-production with Daybreak Pictures and Focus Features)
 In Bruges (co-production with Focus Features)
 In the Shadow of the Moon (co-production with Discovery Films and Passion Pictures)
 Institute Benjamenta (co-production with Pandora Film)
 Invincible (co-production with Fine Line Features)
 Jimmy's Hall
 Joe Strummer: The Future Is Unwritten
 Journeyman
 K-PAX (co-production with Universal Pictures and Intermedia Films)
 Kill List (co-production with UK Film Council, Warp X, Screen Yorkshire and Rook Films)
 Ladybird, Ladybird
 Last Night in Soho (co-production with Focus Features and Working Title Films)
 Late Night Shopping (co-production with Scottish Screen and Glasgow Film Office)
 Le Week-End
 Lean on Pete (co-production with British Film Institute)
 Life (co-production with See-Saw Films, Telefilm Canada and Screen Australia)
 Life Is Sweet
 London Kills Me (co-production with PolyGram Filmed Entertainment and Working Title Films)
 Looking for Eric (co-production with Icon Entertainment International and Wild Bunch)
 Lucky Break (co-production with Paramount Pictures and Miramax Films)
 Macbeth (co-production with StudioCanal, DMC Film, Anton Capital Entertainment, Creative Scotland and See-Saw Films)
 Martha, Meet Frank, Daniel and Laurence
 Mary Magdalene (co-production with Universal Pictures, Porchlight Films, Affirm Films, Columbia Pictures and See-Saw Films) 
 Me and You and Everyone We Know
 Mister Lonely (co-production with Recorded Picture Company)
 Moonlighting
 Mr. Turner (co-production with British Film Institute, Focus Features International and Thin Man Films)
 My Beautiful Laundrette (co-production with SAF Productions and Working Title Films)
 My Name Is Joe
 Neds (co-production with Scottish Screen, UK Film Council and Wild Bunch)
 Never Let Me Go (co-production with DNA Films and Fox Searchlight Pictures)
 Night on Earth (co-production with JVC Entertainment, Victor Music Industries, Le Studio Canal + and Pandora Film)
 Nothing Personal (co-production with Bórd Scannán na hÉireann/Irish Film Board)
 Nowhere Boy (co-production with UK Film Council, Ecosse Films and The Weinstein Company)
 On the Road (co-production with American Zoetrope, MK2, France Télévisions, Canal+, Ciné+, France 2 Cinéma and Vanguard Films)
 Once Upon a Time in the Midlands (co-production with UK Film Council)
 One Day (co-production with Focus Features, Random House Films and Color Force)
 Orphans (co-production with Scottish Arts Council and Glasgow Film Office)
 P'tang, Yang, Kipperbang
 Paris, Texas (co-production with Westdeutscher Rundfunk)
 Peter's Friends (co-production with The Samuel Goldwyn Company)
 Peterloo (co-production with British Film Institute, Amazon Studios and Thin Man Films)
 Prospero's Books (co-production with Canal+, Eurimages, VPRO, NHK, Cineplex Odeon Films and Palace Pictures)
 Purely Belter
 Queen of Hearts (co-production with Nelson Entertainment, TVS Television and Cinecom)
 Raining Stones
 Red Monarch (co-production with Goldcrest Films and Enigma Productions)
 Remembrance
 Riff-Raff
 Rita, Sue and Bob Too
 Room (co-production with Element Pictures and No Trace Camping)
 Saint Maud (co-production with British Film Institute, Escape Plan Productions and StudioCanal)
 Sammy and Rosie Get Laid (co-production with Working Title Films)
 Secrets & Lies (co-production with Ciby 2000)
 Series 7: The Contenders (co-production with USA Films)
 Seven Psychopaths (co-production with British Film Institute, HanWay Films and CBS Films)
 Sexy Beast (Co-production with Kanzaman, Fox Searchlight Pictures and Recorded Picture Company)
 Shallow Grave
 Shame (co-production with Fox Searchlight Pictures, UK Film Council, See-Saw Films, HanWay Films and Momentum Pictures/Alliance Films)
 Shaun of the Dead (co-production with Big Talk Productions, Working Title Films, StudioCanal, Universal Pictures and Rogue Pictures)
 She'll Be Wearing Pink Pyjamas
 Shopping (co-production with Kuzui Enterprises and PolyGram Filmed Entertainment)
 Sightseers (co-production with Big Talk Pictures)
 Sister My Sister
 Slow West (co-production with the New Zealand Film Commission and See-Saw Films)
 Slumdog Millionaire (co-production with Fox Searchlight Pictures, Warner Bros. Pictures, Pathé and Celador Films)
 Starred Up (co-production with Creative Scotland, Northern Ireland Screen and Sigma Films)
 Stormy Monday (co-production with Atlantic Entertainment Group)
 Straightheads (co-production with Ingenious Film Partners and UK Film Council)
 Submarine (co-production with Red Hour Films and Warp Films)
 Suffragette (co-production with 20th Century Fox, Pathé, BFI, Ingenious Media, Canal+, Cine+ and Ruby Films)
 Sunshine (co-production with Alliance Atlantis, Eurimages, Telefilm Canada, The Movie Network, Kinowelt, TV2, ORF and Paramount Classics)
 The Acid House
 The Actors (co-production with Miramax Films and Bórd Scannán na hÉireann/Irish Film Board)
 The Baby of Mâcon (co-production with UGC and Canal+)
 The Belly of an Architect (co-production with Hemdale Film Corporation)
 The Crying Game (co-production with British Screen, Eurotrustees, Nippon Film Development and Finance and Palace Pictures)
 The Debt Collector
 The Deep Blue Sea (co-production with UK Film Council and Artificial Eye)
 The Double (co-production with Alcove Entertainment and British Film Institute)
 The Draughtsman's Contract  (co-production with British Film Institute)
 The Eagle (co-production with Focus Features)
 The Emperor's New Clothes
 The Favourite (co-production with Fox Searchlight Pictures and Element Pictures)
 The Festival (co-production with Entertainment Film Distributors)
 The Filth and the Fury (co-production with Jersey Films)
 The Future (co-production with Medienboard Berlin-Brandenburg)
 The Great Bear
 The House of Mirth (co-production with Granada Productions, Kinowelt, Arts Council of England, Showtime Networks and The Scottish Arts Council)
 The Inbetweeners Movie (co-production with Bwark Productions, Young Films and Entertainment Film Distributors)
 The Inbetweeners 2 (co-production with Bwark Productions)
 The Iron Lady (co-production with Pathé, UK Film Council and The Weinstein Company)
 The King
 The Killing of a Sacred Deer (co-production with Element Pictures, Newsparta Films & A24)
 The Land Girls (co-production with PolyGram Filmed Entertainment, Gramercy Pictures, Intermedia Films and Canal+)
 The Last King of Scotland (co-production with DNA Films and Fox Searchlight Pictures)
 The League of Gentlemen's Apocalypse (co-production with Universal Pictures and Tiger Aspect)
 The Little Stranger (co-production with Pathé, Canal+ and Element Pictures)
 The Lobster (co-production with Irish Film Board, Eurimages, Netherlands Film Fund, British Film Institute, Canal+, Ciné+, CNC, Institut Français, Greek Film Centre, Element Pictures, Scarlet Films, Faliro House, Haut et Court and Lemming Films)
 The Look of Love (co-production with StudioCanal UK, Revolution Films and Baby Cow Productions)
 The Lovely Bones (co-production with DreamWorks Pictures and Paramount Pictures)
 The Low Down (co-production with British Screen, Oil Factory and Sleeper Films)
 The Madness of King George (co-production with The Samuel Goldwyn Company)
 The Miracle
 The Motorcycle Diaries
 The Navigators (co-production with Road Movies Filmproduktion, Westdeutscher Rundfunk and Arte)
 The Neon Bible (co-production with Artificial Eye)
 The Personal History of David Copperfield (co-production with FilmNation Entertainment)
 The Pillow Book (co-production with Canal+)
 A Pin for the Butterfly
 The Ploughman's Lunch (co-production with Goldcrest Films and Michael White)
 The Pope Must Die (co production with Miramax Films, Palace Pictures and Michael White)
 The Red Violin (co-production with New Line Cinema, Lionsgate, Telefilm Canada and CITY-TV)
 The Riot Club (co-production with Universal Pictures, British Film Institute, HanWay Films and Pinewood Pictures)
 The Selfish Giant (co-production with British Film Institute)
 The Scouting Book for Boys (co-production with Celador Films, Screen East and Pathé)
 The Spirit of '45
 The Stone Roses: Made of Stone (co-production with Warp Films)
 The Straight Story (co-production with StudioCanal and Walt Disney Pictures)
 The Supergrass (co-production with The Comic Strip and Michael White)
 The Woman in the Fifth (co-production with UK Film Council, Canal+, Orange Cinéma Séries and Artificial Eye)
 The Woodlanders (co-production with Pathé Productions and Arts Council of England)
 This Is England (co-production with UK Film Council, Optimum Releasing, Screen Yorkshire and Warp Films)
 Three Billboards Outside Ebbing, Missouri (co-production with Fox Searchlight Pictures and Blueprint Pictures)
 To Kill a King (co-production with Natural Nylon and HanWay Films)
 Touching the Void (co-production with Channel 4, UK Film Council, Darlow Smithson Productions and PBS)
 Trainspotting
 T2 Trainspotting (co-production with TriStar Pictures, Cloud Eight Films and DNA Films)
 Trance (co-production with Pathé, Fox Searchlight Pictures and Cloud Eight Films and Indian Paintbrush)
 Trespass Against Us (co-production with Potboiler Productions)
 Trojan Eddie (co-production with Bórd Scannán na hÉireann/Irish Film Board)
 True Blue
 True History of the Kelly Gang (co-production with Film Victoria and Screen Australia)
 Tyrannosaur (co-production with Warp X, Inflammable Films, UK Film Council, Screen Yorkshire, EM Media, and Optimum Releasing (as StudioCanal UK))
 Under the Skin (co-production with British Film Institute, FilmNation Entertainment, Scottish Screen, Nick Wechsler Productions and A24 Films)
 Una (co-production with Bron Studios, Jean Doumanian Productions, and WestEnd Films)
 Velvet Goldmine (co-production with Newmarket Capital Group, Miramax Films, Killer Films and Zenith Entertainment)
 Venus (co-production with UK Film Council and Miramax Films)
 Very Annie Mary (co-production with Canal+)
 Walking and Talking (co-production with Miramax Films, Zenith Productions, Pandora Film, Mikado Films (France), Electric, TEAM Communications Group, PolyGram Filmed Entertainment and Good Machine)
 Walter
 Waterland
 Welcome to Sarajevo (co-production with Miramax Films)
 When the Wind Blows (co-production with Kings Road Entertainment)
 Widows (co-production with 20th Century Fox, Regency Enterprises and See-Saw Films)
 Wild West Wish You Were Here With or Without You (co-production with Miramax Films and Revolution Films)
 Wittgenstein (co-production with the British Film Institute)
 Wuthering Heights (co-production with HanWay Films, Ecosse Films, UK Film Council, Goldcrest Films and Screen Yorkshire)
 You Were Never Really Here (co-production with Why Not Productions, British Film Institute and Page 114)
 Zastrozzi, A Romance''

References

External links 
 Film4 Productions

Channel 4
Film production companies of the United Kingdom
BAFTA Outstanding British Contribution to Cinema Award